For Georgia is a political party in Georgia founded by former Georgian Prime Minister Giorgi Gakharia. The presentation of the party was held on May 29, 2021.

History
Giorgi Gakharia resigned as Prime Minister on February 18. According to him, it was unjustified to arrest the chairman of the United National Movement, Nika Melia, in conditions when there was a danger of political escalation. According to Giorgi Gakharia, the reason for his resignation was also that he could not reach an agreement with the Georgian Dream team.

On March 22, 2021, Gakharia announced that he remains in politics and is working to set a political agenda.

On April 14, 2021, the Georgian Dream Party and the parliamentary majority were abandoned by MPs Giorgi Khojevanishvili, Beka Liluashvili, Ana Buchukuri, Alexander Motserelia, Shalva Kereselidze and Mikheil Daushvili. According to the deputies, they are forming a new party together with Giorgi Gakharia.

3 majoritarians left the Georgian Dream and were elected by 3 party lists. Giorgi Khojevanishvili was the governor of Shida Kartli before being elected as a majoritarian MP in Gori-Kaspi. Alexander Motserelia, the former governor of Samegrelo-Zemo Svaneti, is currently the majoritarian MP of Abasha-Martvili-Tsalenjikha-Chkhorotsku, and Shalva Kereselidze, the former governor of Mtskheta-Mtianeti, is majoritarian of Mtskheta-Dusheti-Tianeti-Kazbegi.

Ana Buchukuri, elected from the Georgian Dream party list, was in the government of Giorgi Gakharia, Deputy Chief of Staff of the Prime Minister, Beka Liluashvili – Adviser to the Prime Minister on Economic Affairs, and Mikheil Daushvili – Business Ombudsman.

On May 28, Giorgi Gakharia was joined by Giorgi Abashishvili, Head of the Presidential Administration of Georgia, and Levan Dolidze, former Ambassador of Georgia to NATO.

On July 9, former Zugdidi mayor Giorgi Shengalia, who had resigned from his post 2 months earlier, joined For Georgia.

On July 14, seven high-ranking assembly members of the Khashuri municipal council left the local Georgian Dream party and joined Gakharia's party.

On 16 July, the party gained a new member in Zviad Dolidze, member of the Rustavi City Assembly and Deputy Chairman of the Georgian Dream in the assembly.

On 21 July, it was announced that former footballer Archil Arveladze would possibly be For Georgia's candidate for Tbilisi mayor in the 2021 Georgian local elections.

Members of Political Council 

 Giorgi Khojevanishvili – former Governor of Shida Kartli, Member of Parliament
 Natia Mezvrishvili – former Head of Government Administration
 Giorgi Sharashidze – Editor-in-Chief of the magazine "Entrepreneur"
 Kakha Kemoklidze – former employee of the State Security Service
 Ana Buchukuri – lawyer, Member of Parliament
 Mikheil Daushvili – Corporate Law Specialist, Member of Parliament
 Beka Liluashvili – former employee of the government administration, Member of Parliament
 Rusudan Tevzadze – social security expert
 Alexander Motserelia – former Governor of Samegrelo-Zemo Svaneti, Member of Parliament
 Berdia Sichinava – former employee of the government administration
 Shalva Kereselidze – former Governor of Mtskheta-Mtianeti, Member of Parliament
 Kote Ananiashvili – former Chief of Adjara Police
 Giga Parulava – Lawyer
 Giorgi Goguadze – International Relations specialist

Political platform

For Georgia seeks to develop pragmatic economic policy based on free market principles, create social protection system which will provide basic social services for the most vulnerable groups of population, strengthen rule of law and checks and balances, reform education system to create competitive human capital, reduce bureaucracy and centralization, take active measures against corruption and influence of interest groups on government agencies, and further integration of Georgia into European Union and NATO.

Electoral Performance

Local elections

Seats in Municipal assemblies

External links
Party Official site

References

Political parties in Georgia (country)
Pro-European political parties in Georgia (country)
Political parties established in 2021